Ō Rissei (born 7 November 1958) is a professional Go player in Japan.

Rissei was born in Taiwan and moved to Japan when he was 13 years old; he would become professional the following year. His instructor is Kano Yoshinori, while he is the instructor of his daughter O Keii, professional 2 dan.

Titles and runners-up 
Ranks #10-t in total number of titles in Japan.

External links
GoBase Profile
Nihon Ki-in Profile (Japanese)

1958 births
Living people
Taiwanese Go players
Japanese people of Taiwanese descent
People from Nantou County